Sev is a popular Indian snack food consisting of small pieces of crunchy noodles made from chickpea flour paste, which are seasoned with turmeric, cayenne, and ajwain before being deep-fried in oil. These noodles vary in thickness. Ready-to-eat varieties of sev, including flavoured sev, are available in Indian stores.

Sev is eaten as a standalone snack as well as a topping on dishes like bhelpuri and sevpuri. Sev can be made at home and stored for weeks in airtight containers.

Sev is a popular snack in India with several regional variations, particularly for chaat snacks in Uttar Pradesh and Bihar where it is eaten topped with sweetened boondi. The snack is also popular in Madhya Pradesh, especially in the cities of Indore, Ujjain and Ratlam, where many snack foods consist of sev as a main ingredient. In Madhya Pradesh, sev is used as a side ingredient in almost every chaat snack food, especially ratlami sev, which is made from cloves and chickpea flour. Many varieties of sev are sold commercially, such as laung (clove in Hindi) sev, tomato sev, palak sev, plain sev, and bhujia.

Mota sev is a variety of sev which is bigger in size. 

In the UK, popular varieties of sev mixed with nuts, lentils and pulses are commonly sold as 'Bombay mix'.

References 

Indian snack foods
Deep fried foods
Chickpea dishes